The Surry County Regiment was established on August 26, 1775 by the North Carolina Provincial Congress.  The regiment was engaged in battles and skirmishes against the British and Cherokee during the American Revolution in North Carolina, South Carolina Tennessee, and Georgia between 1776 and 1782.  It was active until the end of the war.

History
The Surry County Regiment was one of the 35 existing North Carolina county militias that were authorized to be organized by the North Carolina Provincial Congress on September 9, 1775.  The officers were appointed by the North Carolina Provincial Congress.  The regiment had only one commander, Colonel Martin Armstrong.  The Surry County Regiment became part of the Salisbury District Brigade commanded by Brigadier General Griffith Rutherford when it was established on May 4, 1776.  The regiment was active until the end of the Revolutionary War in 1783.

Officers
The known officers of the Surry County Regiment included:

Commanders
 Colonel Martin Armstrong (commandant, 1775-1783)
 Colonel Joseph Williams (2nd colonel, 1776-1783) (Lieutenant Colonel, 17751776)

Lieutenant Colonels:
Lt. Col. Joseph Williams
Lt. Col. Robert Lanier
Lt. Col. David Looney
Lt. Col. John "Jack" Martin
Lt. Col. Joseph Phillips

Majors:
1st Maj. William Hall
2nd Maj. Joseph Winston
Maj. Micajah Lewis
Maj. Richardson Owens
Maj. John Shepherd
Maj. Henry Smith
Maj. Joseph Vincent
Maj. Jesse Walton
Maj. Gibson Wooldridge

Adjutants:
James Armstrong
Patrick McGibboney
William Queery

The regiment had 121 known companies headed by captains with subordinate lieutenants, ensigns, sergeants, corporals, and privates.

Known engagements
See Salisbury District Brigade engagements matrix for known battles and skirmishes involving companies of the Surry County Regiment.

See also
 List of American Revolutionary War battles
 Salisbury District Brigade
 Southern Campaigns: Pension Transactions for a description of the transcription effort by Will Graves
 Southern theater of the American Revolutionary War

References

Bibliography
 Arthur, John Preston, Western North Carolina; a history (1730-1913), National Society Daughters of the American Revolution of North Carolina. Edward Buncombe Chapter, Asheville, North Carolina,  Publication date 1914, Link, accessed Jan 29, 2019
 
 Hunter, C.L.; Sketches of western North Carolina, historical and biographical : illustrating principally the Revolutionary period of Mecklenburg, Rowan, Lincoln, and adjoining counties, accompanied with miscellaneous information, much of it never before published, Raleigh : Raleigh News Steam Job Print, 1877; pages 166-183
 

North Carolina militia
Surry County, North Carolina
1775 establishments in North Carolina